Byron De La Beckwith Jr. (November 9, 1920 – January 21, 2001) was an American murderer, a white supremacist and a member of the Ku Klux Klan from Greenwood, Mississippi. He murdered the civil rights leader Medgar Evers on June 12, 1963. Two trials in 1964 on that charge, with all-white Mississippi juries, resulted in hung juries. In 1994, he was tried by the state in a new trial which was based on new evidence. He was convicted of murder and sentenced to life in prison.

Early life and career
De La Beckwith was born in Colusa, California, the son of Byron De La Beckwith Sr., who was the town's postmaster and Susan Southworth Yerger. His father died of pneumonia when he was 5. One year later, he and his mother settled in Greenwood, Mississippi, to be near family. His mother died of lung cancer when he was 12 years old, leaving him orphaned. He was raised by his maternal uncle William Greene Yerger and his wife. He was related by marriage to the socialist author Upton Sinclair, and attended the prestigious southern prep school in Bell Buckle, Tennessee called The Webb School.

In January 1942, De La Beckwith enlisted in the U.S. Marine Corps, serving as a machine gunner in the Pacific theater of World War II. He fought in the Battle of Guadalcanal and was shot in the waist during the Battle of Tarawa. He was honorably discharged in August 1945.

After serving in the Marine Corps, De La Beckwith moved to Providence, Rhode Island, where he married Mary Louise Williams. The couple relocated to Mississippi, where they settled in his hometown of Greenwood. They had a son together, Delay De La Beckwith. De La Beckwith and Williams divorced, and he later married Thelma Lindsay Neff.

De La Beckwith worked as a salesman for most of his life, selling tobacco, fertilizer, wood stoves, and other goods. In 1954, following the United States Supreme Court ruling in Brown v. Board of Education that segregated public schools were unconstitutional, he joined his local White Citizens' Council, and was also a member of the Ku Klux Klan.

Murder of Medgar Evers

On June 12, 1963, at age 42, De La Beckwith murdered NAACP and civil rights leader Medgar Evers shortly after the activist arrived home in Jackson. Beckwith had positioned himself across the street with a rifle, and he shot Evers in the back. Evers died an hour later, aged 37. Myrlie Evers, his wife, and his three children, James, Reena, and Darrell Evers, were home at the time of the assassination. Their son Darrell recalled the night: "We were ready to greet him, because every time he came home it was special for us. He was traveling a lot at that time. All of a sudden, we heard a shot. We knew what it was."

Trials 
The state twice prosecuted De La Beckwith for murder in 1964, but both trials ended with hung juries. Mississippi had effectively disenfranchised black voters since 1890, so they were in practice excluded from serving on juries, whose members were drawn from voter rolls. During the second trial, Ross Barnett, Democratic Governor of Mississippi at the time of the assassination, shook hands with De La Beckwith in the courtroom. The White Citizens' Council paid De La Beckwith's legal expenses in both his 1964 trials.

In January 1966, De La Beckwith, along with a number of other members of the White Knights of the Ku Klux Klan, was subpoenaed by the House Un-American Activities Committee to testify about Klan activities. Although De La Beckwith gave his name when asked by the committee (other witnesses, such as Samuel Bowers, invoked the Fifth Amendment in response to that question), he answered no other substantive questions. In the following years, De La Beckwith became a leader in the segregationist Phineas Priesthood, an offshoot of the white supremacist Christian Identity movement. The group was known for its hostility toward African Americans, Jews, Catholics, and foreigners.

According to Delmar Dennis, who acted as a key witness for the prosecution at the 1994 trial, De La Beckwith boasted of his role in the death of Medgar Evers at several Ku Klux Klan rallies and similar gatherings in the years following his mistrials. In 1967, he unsuccessfully sought the Democratic Party's nomination for Lieutenant Governor of Mississippi.

In 1969, De La Beckwith's previous charges were dismissed. In 1973, informants alerted the Federal Bureau of Investigation that he planned to murder A.I. Botnick, director of the New Orleans-based B'nai B'rith Anti-Defamation League. The attack was a racially motivated retaliation for comments that Botnick had made about white Southerners and race relations. Following several days of surveillance, New Orleans Police Department officers stopped De La Beckwith as he was traveling by car on the Lake Pontchartrain Causeway Bridge to New Orleans. Among the contents of his vehicle were several loaded firearms, a map with highlighted directions to Botnick's house, and a dynamite time bomb. On August 1, 1975, De La Beckwith was convicted of conspiracy to commit murder; he served nearly three years at the Angola Prison in Louisiana from May 1977 until he was paroled in January 1980. Just before entering prison to serve his sentence, De La Beckwith was ordained by Reverend Dewey "Buddy" Tucker as a minister in the Temple Memorial Baptist Church, a Christian Identity congregation in Knoxville, Tennessee.

In the 1980s, the Jackson Clarion-Ledger published reports on its investigation of De La Beckwith's trials in the 1960s. It found that the Mississippi State Sovereignty Commission, a state agency supported by residents' taxes and purportedly protecting the image of the state, had assisted De La Beckwith's attorneys in his second trial. The commission had worked against the civil rights movement in numerous ways. In this case, it used state resources to investigate members of the jury pool during voir dire to aid the defense in picking a sympathetic jury. These findings of illegality contributed to a retrial of De La Beckwith by the state in 1994.

1994 trial for Evers murder
Myrlie Evers, who later became the third woman to chair the NAACP, refused to abandon her husband's case. When new documents showed that jurors in the previous case were investigated illegally and screened by a state agency, she pressed authorities to reopen the case. In the 1980s, the reporting by Jerry Mitchell of the Jackson Clarion-Ledger about the earlier Beckwith trials resulted in the state mounting a new investigation. It ultimately initiated a third prosecution, based on this and other new evidence.

By this time, De La Beckwith was living in Walden, Tennessee, just outside Signal Mountain, Tennessee, a suburb of Chattanooga, Tennessee. He was extradited to Mississippi for trial at the Hinds County Courthouse in Jackson. Before his trial, the 71-year-old white supremacist had asked the justices to dismiss the case against him on the grounds that it violated his rights to a speedy trial, due process and protection from double jeopardy. The Mississippi Supreme Court ruled against his motion by a 4–3 vote, and the case was scheduled to be heard in January 1994.

During this third trial, the murder weapon was presented, an Enfield .30-06 caliber rifle, with Beckwith's fingerprints. Beckwith claimed that the gun was stolen from his house. He listed his health problems, high blood pressure, lack of energy and kidney problems, saying, "I need a list to recite everything I suffer from, and I hate to complain because I'm not the complaining type". On February 5, 1994, a jury composed of eight African-Americans and four whites, convicted De La Beckwith of murder for killing Medgar Evers. He was sentenced to life in prison. New evidence included testimony that during the three decades since the crime had occurred, De La Beckwith had boasted of having committed the murder on multiple occasions-including at a Klan rally. The physical evidence was essentially the same as that presented during the first two trials.

De La Beckwith appealed against the guilty verdict, but the Mississippi Supreme Court upheld the conviction in 1997. The court said that the 31-year lapse between the murder and De La Beckwith's conviction did not deny him a fair trial. De La Beckwith sought judicial review in the United States Supreme Court, but his petition for certiorari was denied.

On January 21, 2001, De La Beckwith died after he was transferred from prison to the University of Mississippi Medical Center in Jackson, Mississippi. He was 80 years old. He had suffered from heart disease, high blood pressure, and other ailments for some time.

Representation in other media
 Where Is the Voice Coming From? (1963), a short story by Eudora Welty, was published in The New Yorker on July 6, 1963. Welty, who was from Jackson, Mississippi, later said: "Whoever the murderer is, I know him: not his identity, but his coming about, in this time and place. That is, I ought to have learned by now, from here, what such a man, intent on such a deed, had going on in his mind. I wrote his story—my fiction—in the first person: about that character's point of view." It was published before De La Beckwith's arrest. So accurate was her portrayal that the magazine changed several details in the story before publication for legal reasons.

 Byron De La Beckwith was the subject of the 1963 Bob Dylan song "Only a Pawn in Their Game", which deplores Evers' murder and attempts to minimize De La Beckwith as "only a pawn in the game" as a poor white man manipulated by Southern politicians.

 In 1991, the murder of Evers and first trials of Beckwith were the basis of the episode titled "Sweet, Sweet Blues", written by author William James Royce for the NBC television series In the Heat of the Night. In the episode, actor James Best plays a character based on De La Beckwith, an aging Klansman who appears to have gotten away with murder.

 The feature film Ghosts of Mississippi (1996) tells the story of the murder and 1994 trial. James Woods' performance as De La Beckwith was nominated for an Academy Award.

 In 2001, Bobby DeLaughter published his memoir of the case and trial, Never Too Late: A Prosecutor’s Story of Justice in the Medgar Evers Trial.

References

Further reading
 
 
 
 
 
 
 
 
 
 
 
 
 
 Never Too Late: A Prosecutor's Story of Justice in the Medgar Evers Case. New York: Simon and Schuster. 2001-09-16. . Retrieved June 13, 2013.

External links

See also

 Thomas Edwin Blanton Jr.
 Samuel Bowers
 Herman Frank Cash
 Robert Edward Chambliss
 Bobby Frank Cherry

1920 births
2001 deaths
1963 murders in the United States
American assassins
American criminal snipers
American people convicted of murder
United States Marine Corps personnel of World War II
United States Marines
Ku Klux Klan crimes in Mississippi
American Ku Klux Klan members
People from Colusa, California
People from Greenwood, Mississippi
People from Jackson, Mississippi
Military personnel from California
Racially motivated violence against African Americans
B
American people who died in prison custody
American prisoners sentenced to life imprisonment
Prisoners sentenced to life imprisonment by Mississippi
Prisoners who died in Mississippi detention
People convicted of murder by Mississippi
People extradited within the United States
People from Signal Mountain, Tennessee
Mississippi Democrats
American members of the clergy convicted of crimes
20th-century American clergy
Christian Identity
20th-century far-right politicians in the United States